Dangerous Connection is the second studio album by Boston underground hip hop duo 7L & Esoteric. It was released on October 8, 2002

Track listing

References

2002 albums
7L & Esoteric albums